Sorath Thebo is a Pakistani politician who had been a Member of the Provincial Assembly of Sindh, from June 2013 to May 2018.

Early life
She was born on 15 December 1958 in Dadu.

Political career
She was elected to the Provincial Assembly of Sindh as a candidate of Pakistan Muslim League (N) on a reserved seat for women in 2013 Pakistani general election.

References

Living people
Sindh MPAs 2013–2018
1958 births
Pakistan Muslim League (N) politicians